Miss France 2016 was the 86th Miss France pageant, held in Lille on 19 December 2015. Miss France 2015, Camille Cerf crowned her successor Iris Mittenaere at the end of the event. This was the third back-to-back in Miss France history after 1948-1950 and 1989-1990. Mittenaere represented France at Miss Universe 2016, where she was crowned the winner.

The theme of the event was "the dream", it was presented by the national director Sylvie Tellier and Jean-Pierre Foucault for the 21st consecutive year. The event was broadcast live by TF1.

Results

Placements

Preparation
The 31 contestants, Camille Cerf and the national director Sylvie Tellier had travelled to French Polynesia from November, 22 to November, 29.
The rehearsals took place in Lille.

Pageant

The theme of the 2016 event was "The Dream".  The rounds centered around the dreams of former Miss France winners.

Presentation round, group 1: Pirates (dream of Miss France 2011, Laury Thilleman)
Presentation round, group 2: Animals (dream of Miss France 2012, Delphine Wespiser)
Presentation round, group 3: Sports (dream of Miss France 2006, Alexandra Rosenfeld)
Regional costumes: Toys (dream of Miss France 2014, Flora Coquerel)
Swimwear: Superheroes (dream of Miss France 2013, Marine Lorphelin)
Announcement of top 12
Top 12 long gown: Divas (dream of Miss France 2009, Chloé Mortaud)
Top 12 swimsuits: Christmas (dream of Miss France 2007, Rachel Legrain-Trapani)
Announcement of top 5
Top 5: Candy Shop (dream of Miss France 2008, Valérie Bègue)
Top 5 long gown: Top Model (dream of Miss France 2010, Malika Ménard)

Contestants

Placements

First round 

A jury composed of partners (internal and external) of the company Miss France pre-selects 12 young women, during an interview that took place on 17 December.

Second round 
The 50% jury and the 50% public choose the five candidates who can still be elected. A ranking ofrom 1 to 12 is established for each of the two parties.

Classement des finalistes par points :

Last round 
Only the audience can choose the winner and her runners-up by voting.

Judges 
The complete panel of judges was revealed on 11 December.

Crossovers 
Contestants who previously competed or will be competing at international beauty pageants:

Miss Universe
2016:  Nord-Pas-de-Calais – Iris Mittenaere (Winner)
 (Pasay)

Miss World
2016:  Martinique – Morgane Edvige (Top 20)
 (Washington)

References

External links

2015 in France
December 2015 events in France
Miss France
2015 beauty pageants